William Hall Doolittle (November 6, 1848 – February 26, 1914) was a U.S. Representative from Washington.

Born near North East in Erie County, Pennsylvania, Doolittle moved with his parents to Portage County, Wisconsin, in 1859.
He attended the district school.
Early in 1865, he enlisted as a private in the Ninth Wisconsin Battery.
He went to Pennsylvania in 1867 and pursued an academic course.
He studied law in Chautauqua County, New York, and was admitted to the bar in 1871.
He moved to Nebraska in 1872 and commenced practice in Tecumseh, Johnson County.
He served as member of the State house of representatives 1874–1876.
He served as assistant United States district attorney 1876–1880.
He moved to Washington Territory in 1880 and settled in Colfax, Whitman County.
He engaged in the practice of law.
He moved to Tacoma in 1888.

Doolittle was elected as a Republican to the Fifty-third and Fifty-fourth Congresses (March 4, 1893 – March 3, 1897).
He was unsuccessful for reelection in 1896 to the Fifty-fifth Congress.
He resumed the practice of law.
He died in Tacoma, Washington, February 26, 1914.
He was interred in Tacoma Cemetery.

Sources

1848 births
1914 deaths
Members of the Nebraska House of Representatives
Republican Party members of the United States House of Representatives from Washington (state)
19th-century American politicians